"Get Enough" is a song by English musician Paul McCartney, released as a surprise single on 1 January 2019.

Release
"Get Enough" was a surprise release with no promotion from McCartney or his label prior to its release. The song is a non-album track and does not feature on his Egypt Station studio album standard (or Target) version but later featured on CD (only) on the  "Traveller's Edition" and "Explorer's Edition" box sets version of the album (a strictly limited Deluxe edition of 3,000 copies released on 10 May 2019 for the former version and a widespread edition to be released on 17 May 2019 for the latter version). The release of the song marked 2019 as the 59th consecutive year (since 1961) either The Beatles, or a member of that group, has released a single or an album during the calendar year. The song reached number 21 on the Brazilian iTunes chart.

Composition
"Get Enough" is a piano ballad that features heavy use of Auto-Tune to alter McCartney's voice.  McCartney was originally concerned about the possible backlash of using Auto-Tune, but decided to use it based on The Beatles' willingness to embrace new production techniques.

The song was co-written and produced with McCartney by Ryan Tedder and Zach Skelton and was one of three songs McCartney produced with Tedder during the recording of his album Egypt Station including "Fuh You" and "Nothing for Free".

Track listing
Streaming single / CD box set edition 
"Get Enough"   – 2:58

Personnel

 Paul McCartney – lead vocal, bass guitar, piano, acoustic guitar, harpsichord, synthesizer, synth-bass and drums 
 Ryan Tedder – programming, background vocals
 Zach Skelton – editing and programming 9

References

2019 singles
2018 songs
Paul McCartney songs
Capitol Records singles
Song recordings produced by Ryan Tedder
Songs written by Paul McCartney
Pop ballads
2010s ballads
Songs written by Ryan Tedder
Songs written by Zach Skelton